Grade 2 may refer to:

Grade 2, the second year of primary education.
Grade 2 horse races, the second tier in worldwide horse racing.
Grade 2, the English punk band.

Grade II may refer to:
 Grade II listed buildings that are of special interest, warranting every effort to preserve them.
 Grade II monoplane, a single-seat aircraft constructed by Hans Grade in 1909. 

Grade II* may refer to:
 Grade II* listed buildings that are particularly important and of more than special interest.